The 1992 NCAA Division I softball season, play of college softball in the United States organized by the National Collegiate Athletic Association (NCAA) at the Division I level, began in February 1992.  The season progressed through the regular season, many conference tournaments and championship series, and concluded with the 1992 NCAA Division I softball tournament and 1992 Women's College World Series.  The Women's College World Series, consisting of the eight remaining teams in the NCAA Tournament and held in Oklahoma City at ASA Hall of Fame Stadium, ended on May 26, 1992.

Conference standings

Women's College World Series
The 1992 NCAA Women's College World Series took place from May 23 to May 26, 1992 in Oklahoma City.

Season leaders
Batting
Batting average: .513 – Crystal Boyd, Hofstra Pride
RBIs: 61 – Dana Fulmore, South Carolina Gamecocks
Home runs: 11 – Yvonne Gutierrez, UCLA Bruins & Heather Robinson, Sam Houston State Bearkats

Pitching
Wins: 38-13 – Jenny Parsons, East Carolina Pirates
ERA: 0.14 (4 ER/196.1 IP) – Lisa Fernandez, UCLA Bruins
Strikeouts: 329 – Michele Granger, California Golden Bears

Records
Freshman class single game triples:
3 – Melissa Scarborough, UMBC Retrievers; April 3, 1992

Sophomore class single game walks:
5 – Coli Turley, Eastern Illinois Panthers; March 31, 1992

Junior class consecutive games hit streak:
30 – Janna Venice, UConn Huskies; March 13-April 26, 1992

Senior class single game stolen bases:
6 – Ronda Carter, Akron Zips; April 24, 1992

Sophomore class winning percentage:
28-0 (100%) – Rebecca Aase, Florida State Seminoles

Junior class shutouts:
26 – Michele Granger, California Golden Bears

Team winning percentage:
54-2 (96%) – UCLA Bruins

Awards
Honda Sports Award Softball:
Lisa Fernandez, UCLA Bruins

All America Teams
The following players were members of the All-American Teams.

First Team

Second Team

Third Team

References

External links